Lakselva is a river in Troms og Finnmark county in northern Norway. It begins in Karasjok Municipality runs north through Porsanger Municipality into the Porsangerfjorden, a fjord off of the Barents Sea. The European route E06 highway runs along the river for much of its course. The river is famous for its Atlantic salmon fishing.

References

Porsanger
Rivers of Troms og Finnmark
Rivers of Norway